West Scotland is one of the eight electoral regions of the Scottish Parliament. Ten of the parliament's 73 first past the post constituencies are sub-divisions of the region and it elects seven of the 56 additional-member Members of the Scottish Parliament (MSPs). Thus it elects a total of 17 MSPs.

The West Scotland electoral region was created as a result of the First Periodic Review of Scottish Parliament Boundaries and largely replaced the West of Scotland region.

Constituencies and local government areas

In terms of first past the post constituencies the region covers:

Members of the Scottish Parliament

Constituency MSPs

Regional list MSPs
N.B. This table is for presentation purposes only

Election results

2021 Scottish Parliament election

In the 2021 Scottish Parliament election the region elected MSPs as follows:

Constituency results 
{| class=wikitable
!colspan=4 style=background-color:#f2f2f2|2021 Scottish Parliament election: West Scotland
|-
! colspan=2 style="width: 200px"|Constituency
! style="width: 150px"|Elected member
! style="width: 300px"|Result

Additional member results

2016 Scottish Parliament election

In the 2016 Scottish Parliament election the region elected MSPs as follows:
 8 Scottish National Party MSPs (all constituency members)
 4 Labour MSPs (one constituency member and three additional members)
 4 Conservative MSPs (one constituency member and three additional members)
 1 Scottish Greens MSP (a regional member)

Constituency results 
{| class=wikitable
!colspan=4 style=background-color:#f2f2f2|2016 Scottish Parliament election: West Scotland
|-
! colspan=2 style="width: 200px"|Constituency
! style="width: 150px"|Elected member
! style="width: 300px"|Result

Additional member results
Elected regional list MSPs are shown in bold; elected constituency MSPs, who stood on a party list, are shown in italics.

2011 Scottish Parliament election

In the 2011 Scottish Parliament election the region elected MSPs as follows:
 8 Scottish National Party MSPs (six constituency members and two additional members)
 7 Labour MSPs (four constituency members and three additional members)
 2 Conservative MSPs (both additional members)

Constituency results 
{| class=wikitable
!colspan=4 style=background-color:#f2f2f2|2011 Scottish Parliament election: West Scotland
|-
! colspan=2 style="width: 200px"|Constituency
! style="width: 150px"|Elected member
! style="width: 300px"|Result

Additional member results
{| class=wikitable
!colspan=8 style=background-color:#f2f2f2|2011 Scottish Parliament election: West Scotland
|-
! colspan="2" style="width: 150px"|Party
! Elected candidates
! style="width: 40px"|Seats
! style="width: 40px"|+/−
! style="width: 50px"|Votes
! style="width: 40px"|%
! style="width: 40px"|+/−%
|-

Footnotes 

Scottish Parliamentary regions
Scottish Parliament constituencies and regions from 2011
Politics of West Dunbartonshire
Politics of East Dunbartonshire
Politics of Inverclyde
Politics of Renfrewshire
Politics of East Renfrewshire
Politics of North Ayrshire
Politics of Argyll and Bute